Bakırcı (literally "coppersmith") is a Turkish surname and may refer to:
 Erdi Bakırcı (born 1989), Turkish footballer
 Nazim Bakırcı (born 1986), Turkish cyclist 
 Recep Bakırcı (born 1968), Turkish politician

Epithet 
 Bakırcı Ahmed Pasha (died 1635), Ottoman statesman

Places
 Bakırcı, Azdavay, a village in Turkey

Turkish-language surnames